The 2008 OFC Futsal Championship was the fifth edition of the main international futsal tournament of the Oceanian region. It took place in Suva, Fiji from 8 June to 14 June 2008.

The tournament also acted as a qualifying tournament for the 2008 FIFA Futsal World Cup in Brazil. The Solomon Islands won the tournament, and qualified for the World Cup.

This was the first OFC Futsal Championship tournament not to include Australia as they left the OFC to join the Asian Football Confederation in 2006.

Championship
The seven participating teams played each on a single round-robin format. The top team of the group, the Solomon Islands, won the championship and got a ticket to 2008 Futsal World Cup in Brazil.

References
 OFC Releases Draw for 2008 OFC Futsal

OFC Futsal Championship
2008
Oceanian Futsal Championship, 2008
Futsal
21st century in Fiji
History of Suva
Sport in Suva